Adam Stephen Birchall (born 2 December 1984) is a retired footballer who played as a forward and currently serves as Head Coach for the Arsenal U17 side as well as the assistant manager of the under-18s squad.

Despite being born in England he has several caps for the Welsh under-21 team, scoring on his debut against the Finland under 21s.

Career
Born in Maidstone, Kent, Birchall began his career at Arsenal, but never made it to the first-team. In the 2004–05 season, Birchall had a successful loan spell at Wycombe Wanderers, scoring four goals in twelve league games. He was released by Arsenal at the end of that season, and joined Mansfield Town in June 2005 on a two-year contract.

The move to Mansfield was something of a disappointment for Birchall. Big things were expected from the youngster, but despite occasional flashes of brilliance, he failed to live up to expectations, scoring only three goals and spending most of his time at Mansfield playing on the right of midfield. He did, however, score in Mansfield's nationally televised FA Cup victory against Grays Athletic on his 21st birthday.

On 23 November 2006, Birchall was loaned to divisional rivals Barnet, where he was a hit, scoring the first goal in their 4–1 thrashing of Northampton Town in the FA Cup. A move was made permanent on 4 January 2007. During his time at Barnet, Birchall is credited with the idea for a now widely used scheme whereby only the team captain can question referees' decisions, to reduce dissent and the yellow cards that follow. Since the beginning of the 2007–08 season, when the rule was introduced, the club's disciplinary record has significantly improved, and the club has earned praise throughout the game. After finishing as the top goalscorer for Barnet in the 2007–08 season with 15 goals, Birchall struggled for form in 2009 and was released in May after scoring only two league goals in the 2008–09 season.

Birchall signed for Conference South side Dover Athletic in July 2009. Birchall made his league debut for Dover in the first game of the season against Maidenhead United, before scoring his first league goal for the club in the following fixture against Bishop's Stortford. Birchall scored both goals against Aldershot Town to take Dover to the FA Cup 3rd Round for the first time in their history. Birchall became the club's goalscoring record holder, and the Conference South record holder, at the end of the 2010–11 season with a total of 45 goals in 49 appearances. He also was the top goal scorer in the FA Cup that year and went on to receive the award at Wembley. Birchall again attracted interest from clubs higher up the football pyramid and in July 2011 Dover Athletic received substantial undisclosed bids from League Two sides Swindon Town, newcomers AFC Wimbledon, and local rivals Gillingham, for whom he signed a three-year deal on 12 July 2011. He was seriously injured during a pre-season friendly, however, and missed the entire 2011–12 season.

Birchall finally made his competitive debut for Gillingham on 14 August 2012, coming on as a substitute in a 2–1 away win against Bristol City in the League Cup. He scored his first goal for the Gills in their 4–0 FA Cup win over Scunthorpe United on 3 November, but after playing only 21 games in 2 seasons he was released by the club at the end of the 2013–14 season.

Soon after, Birchall signed for Bromley. He scored his first competitive goal for the club in a 5–1 win over Uxbridge in the FA Cup. His first league goal for the club was a 90th-minute winner against Bishop's Stortford on 9 December.

Coaching career
In July 2016 Birchall returned to his former club Arsenal as a youth coach.

In July 2022, Birchall became under-17s head coach having previously been with the age-group below, as well as becoming assistant head coach for the under-18s to newly appointed Jack Wilshere.

Personal life
In July 2011 Birchall became engaged to Lianne, and the couple's first child was due to be born in October that same year.

Career statistics

Honours
Gillingham
Football League Two: 2012–13

References

External links

1984 births
Living people
Sportspeople from Maidstone
Footballers from Kent
English footballers
Welsh footballers
Wales under-21 international footballers
Association football forwards
Arsenal F.C. players
Wycombe Wanderers F.C. players
Mansfield Town F.C. players
Barnet F.C. players
Dover Athletic F.C. players
Gillingham F.C. players
Dartford F.C. players
Bromley F.C. players
Maidstone United F.C. players
English Football League players
National League (English football) players
Arsenal F.C. non-playing staff